Bianca Dancose-Giambattisto is a Canadian artistic gymnast. She was a member of the Canadian women's national gymnastics team from 2010 to 2012 and competed in college gymnastics for the University of Florida's Florida Gators gymnastics team.

References 

1994 births
Canadian female artistic gymnasts
Florida Gators women's gymnasts
Gymnasts from Montreal
Living people